The 2000 UEFA European Under-19 Championship was held in Germany. Players born after 1 January 1981, were eligible to participate in this competition. The tournament also served as the European qualification for the 2001 FIFA World Youth Championship.

Teams

Squads

Results

Group stage

Group A

Group B

Third place play-off

Final

Qualification to World Youth Championship
The six best performing teams qualified for the 2001 FIFA World Youth Championship.

See also
 2000 UEFA European Under-18 Championship qualifying

External links
Official website
Rec.Sport.Soccer Statistics Foundation results

UEFA European Under-19 Championship
International association football competitions hosted by Germany
Under
UEFA
July 2000 sports events in Europe
2000 in youth association football